The King of Chudong Palace is a 1983 South Korean historical television series, the first installment of the drama series 500 Years of Joseon Dynasty by director Lee Byung-hoon and writer Shin Bong-seung. It aired on MBC from March 31 to July 1, 1983, for 27 episodes. It portrays the fall of Goryeo and the founding of Joseon, with the reigns of Taejo, Jeongjong and Taejong.

Cast

 Bang Hoon as King U of Goryeo
 Jeon Hyeon as King Chang of Goryeo
 Kim Chang-sook as Geun-bi Yi
 Kim Woong-chul as King Gongyang of Goryeo
 Kim Young-ae as Sun-bi No
 Han Young-sook as Jeong-bi An
 Kim Ji-young as Hye-bi Yi
 Kang Suk-ran as Yeong-bi Choi
 Lee Chi-woo as Wang U, prince Jeongyang
 Lee Kyung-ho as Wang Seok, prince Jeongseong
 Kim Gil-ho as Choi Young
 Park Young-tae as Jo Min-soo
 Lee Dae-ro as Lee Saek
 Hong Gye-il as Jeong Mong-ju
 Bak Il as Lee Im
 Joo Hyun as Im Gyeon-mi
 Kim Se-yoon as Do Gil-bu
 Moon Hoe-won as Ban Bok-hae
 Oh Seung-myung as Kim Jeo
 Park Kyung-soon as Jeong Deuk-hoo
 Chae Yeong as Lady Im
 Jeong Yeong-sook as Lady Ryu
Kim Mu-saeng as Lee Seong-gye/King Taejo of Joseon
Kim So-won as Queen Shinui
Kim Jung-yeon as Queen Shindeok
Yang Il-min as Prince Wanpung
Lee Young-hoo Lee Bang-gwa/King Jeongjong of Joseon
Kim Hae-sook as Queen Jeongan
Lee Jung-gil as Lee Bang-won/King Taejong of Joseon
Kim Young-ran as Queen Wongyeong
Kim Joo-young as Lee Bang-gan/Grand Prince Hoean
Jeon Ho-jin as Prince Dokan
Lee Man-sung as Prince Uian
Song Ki-yoon as Prince Yangnyeong
Jeon In-taek as Lee Bang-woo/Prince Jinan
Lee Joo-hoe as Princess Jeongso
Hwang Chi-hoon as Crown Prince Lee Hyang
Kim Al-eum as Lee Yu/Prince Jinyang
Lee Min-woo as Lee Gan/Prince Huryeong
Lee Ho-jae as Jeong Do-jeon
Byun Hee-bong as Nam Eun
Hyun Suk as Jo Joon
Shin Choong-shik as Ha Ryun
Kang Sung-wook as Min Je
Kim Hee-ra as Lee Suk-beon
Im Young-gyu as Buma Yije
Baek In-chul as Mok In-hae
Gook Jung-hwan as Lee Ji-ran

References 

1983 South Korean television series debuts
1983 South Korean television series endings
1990s South Korean television series
MBC TV television dramas
Korean-language television shows
Television series set in Goryeo
South Korean historical television series
Television series set in the 14th century
Television series set in the Joseon dynasty
Television series set in the 15th century